Tong Baocun (November 1933 – 24 October 2020) is a lieutenant general in the People's Liberation Army of China.

He was a member of the 14th Central Committee of the Chinese Communist Party. He was a delegate to the 7th National People's Congress. He was a member of the Standing Committee of the 9th Chinese People's Political Consultative Conference.

Biography
Tong was born in Laoting County, Hebei, in November 1933. 

He enlisted in the People's Liberation Army (PLA) in October 1947, and joined the Chinese Communist Party (CCP) in November 1948. During the Chinese Civil War, he served in the war and engaged in the Yangtze River Crossing campaign and the Battle of Wuhan. After the founding of the Communist State in 1949, he participated in the Korean War. He served in the Jinan Military Region for a long time. In April 1990, he was promoted to become deputy commander of the Shenyang Military Region, a position he held until November 1996.

On 24 October 2020, he died from an illness in Shenyang, Liaoning, at the age of 86.

He was promoted to the rank of major general (shaojiang) in September 1988 and lieutenant general (zhongjiang) in June 1991.

References

1933 births
2020 deaths
People from Laoting County
People's Liberation Army generals from Hebei
People's Republic of China politicians from Hebei
Chinese Communist Party politicians from Hebei
Members of the 14th Central Committee of the Chinese Communist Party
Delegates to the 7th National People's Congress
Members of the Standing Committee of the 9th Chinese People's Political Consultative Conference